Levi Black is a World Cup slalom ski course in Finland at the Levi, Lapland. Above the Arctic Circle, the race course debuted in 2004.

World Cup 

Women's slalom

Men's slalom

References

External links 
 

Skiing in Finland